Daengbyeot is a 1985, South Korean drama film directed by and starring Hah Myung-joong. It was entered into the 35th Berlin International Film Festival.

Cast
 Hah Myung-joong
 Jo Yong-won
 Ju Sang-ho
 Lee In-ok
 Lee Heh-young

References

External links

1985 films
1985 drama films
1980s Korean-language films
Films directed by Hah Myung-joong
South Korean drama films